Frank A. Montaño is an American re-recording mixer. He has been nominated for nine Academy Awards for Best Sound. He has worked on nearly 145 films since 1987.

Selected filmography
 Under Siege (1992)
 The Fugitive (1993)
 Clear and Present Danger (1994)
 Batman Forever (1995)
 Wanted (2008)
 Birdman (2014) 
 Unbroken (2014)
 The Revenant (2015)
 First Man (2018)

References

External links
 

Year of birth missing (living people)
Living people
American audio engineers
Best Sound BAFTA Award winners